Chris Rose is a New York Times Best-Selling New Orleans, Louisiana, writer and journalist. 
For years best known for light-hearted writing in the Times-Picayune, he gained greater attention for his chronicles of the effect of Hurricane Katrina on New Orleans since 2005.

Life
Rose graduated from the Georgetown Preparatory School in 1978 and received a journalism degree from the University of Wisconsin–Madison in 1982. After a stint as a staff writer at The Washington Post, he joined the Times-Picayune as a crime reporter in 1984. Over the years, he has covered national politics, economics, Southern regionalism, pop culture, and New Orleans nightlife, traditions, lifestyles and entertainment.

Post-Katrina, Rose gained notoriety and accolades as he chronicled the personal and public struggles of the disaster-stricken area. Rose's column regularly appears at his "New Orleans stories" Times-Picayune web site. He returned to the theme in various ways, as in satirizing the 2008-2009 e-mail controversies swelling around New Orleans mayor Ray Nagin and Councilwoman Stacy Head.

Rose left the paper in late 2009, and joined the New Orleans alternative weekly paper, Gambit Weekly, in mid February 2010. He moved to WVUE Fox News 8 a year later, where he delivered his pungent commentary on New Orleans life by video and column, up until his abrupt and arguably controversial termination in March 2013.

After his dismissals from Gambit and WVUE, Rose found work as restaurant waiter.  More recently, Chris Rose has been writing for Rouses, a grocery store chain based in Louisiana.  Rose writes for the chain's trade magazine, contributing articles on food related topics.

In 2016, Rose became a licensed tour guide. His walking tour covers mainly the music history of New Orleans and Louisiana.

Rose is also the author of 1 Dead in Attic, which is a collection of stories recounting the first four harrowing months of life in New Orleans after Katrina. The book went on to become a New York Times Bestseller and garnered a number of accolades.

Awards and nominations
Rose was a finalist for the Pulitzer Prize for Distinguished Commentary in 2006 and won a Pulitzer for his contributions to the Times-Picayunes Public Service Award.  He was a finalist for the 2006 Michael Kelly Award.

Rose reigned as King of the Krewe du Vieux for the 2007 New Orleans Mardi Gras season.

Personal life
Rose is divorced from Kelly Gluth Rose''', a native New Orleanian. They have three children: Katherine, Jack and James. The family adopted a dog left homeless by Hurricane Rita and named the dog Luna Biscuit (which, he jokes, is French for Moon Pie). In the 2007 edition of 1 Dead In Attic'' Rose revealed that he and his wife had separated.

In October 2006, Rose wrote about taking anti-depressants after suffering from anxiety and depression after Hurricane Katrina.

Works

See also
 Ed Blakely
 Jacquelyn Brechtel Clarkson
 Stacy Head
 William J. Jefferson
 Angus Lind
 Shelley Stephenson Midura
 Ray Nagin
 Sheila Stroup

References

External links

1960 births
American male journalists
Living people
Writers from New Orleans
University of Wisconsin–Madison School of Journalism & Mass Communication alumni
The Washington Post people
Georgetown Preparatory School alumni